Cychropsis dembickyi is a species of ground beetle in the subfamily of Carabinae. It was described by Imura in 2005.

References

dembickyi
Beetles described in 2005